Alys Williams may refer to:

 Alys Williams (singer) (born  1988), British singer
 Alys Williams (water polo) (born 1994), American water polo player